Mortal Fear is an original novel based on the U.S. television series Buffy the Vampire Slayer.

Plot summary

Something new has swept into the lives of the Scooby Gang, but all through different sources as they try to find acceptance with other people outside their tight knit slayage group; Xander with his co-workers, Willow with her professor at university and Dawn with a new group of not so strait-laced friends. Meanwhile, Buffy is being sent on random missions by a man that goes by the name of Simon. He wants her to retrieve parts of a mystical sword and put them together, but he refuses to say why or who he even is. When her friends suddenly start to turn against her, Buffy has to figure out how the sword and Simon ties into all the odd goings-on in Sunnydale.

Continuity

The Historian's Note incorrectly identifies this story as taking place in the sixth season of Buffy.

Canonical issues

Buffy books such as this one are not usually considered by fans as canonical. Some fans consider them stories from the imaginations of authors and artists, while other fans consider them as taking place in an alternative fictional reality. However unlike fan fiction, overviews summarising their story, written early in the writing process, were 'approved' by both Fox and Joss Whedon (or his office), and the books were therefore later published as officially Buffy/Angel merchandise.

External links

Reviews
Litefoot1969.bravepages.com - Review of this book by Litefoot
Teen-books.com - Reviews of this book
Nika-summers.com - Review of this book by Nika Summers

2003 novels
Books based on Buffy the Vampire Slayer
Pocket Books books